Victoria Sporting Club cricket team is a team that played List A cricket in the Dhaka Premier League up to the 2016–17 season.

History
Victoria Sporting Club cricket team won the Dhaka Premier League title four times in the years before it became a List A competition. In May 2017, they were relegated from the 2016–17 Dhaka Premier Division Cricket League down to the Dhaka First Division Cricket League.

List A record
 2013-14: 9 matches, won 4, finished eighth
 2014-15: 11 matches, won 7, finished seventh
 2015-16: 16 matches, won 9, finished fourth
 2016-17: 13 matches, won 2, finished eleventh
Nasir Hossain was captain in 2013–14, Nadif Chowdhury in 2014-15 and 2015–16, and Monir Hossain in 2016–17.

Records
The highest score is 161 not out (off 136 balls) by Chamara Kapugedera in 2014–15, and the best bowling figures are 6 for 35 by Chaturanga de Silva in 2015–16.

References

External links
 Victoria Sporting Club at CricketArchive

Dhaka Premier Division Cricket League teams